Viktor or Victor Sokolov may refer to:

 Victor Sokolov (1947–2006), Soviet dissident
 Victor Sokolov  Alias name of espionage agent Anatoly Gurevich
 Viktor Sokolov (cyclist) (born 1954), Soviet Olympic cyclist
 Viktor Sokolov (footballer), Soviet player for FC Spartak Moscow in the 1930s and 1940s
 Viktor Sokolov (footballer born 1936), member of the Soviet Union Olympic football team
 Viktor Nikolayevich Sokolov (born 1962), Russian naval officer